The Jersey City Museum was a municipal art museum in Jersey City, New Jersey. The establishment opened in 1901 and was housed in the main branch of the Jersey City Public Library. It relocated to a new building in 2001, but due to financial difficulties and discord with the city, closed to the public in 2010. In 2018, the museum collection was donated to the Zimmerli Art Museum at Rutgers University.

In 2018, the Jersey City municipal government began the process of establishing a new museum in a historic building at Journal Square. After renovations, it is expected to open in 2024 as Centre Pompidou x Jersey City, a satellite museum of the Centre Pompidou, and exhibit works of the twentieth and twenty-first centuries from the Pompidou collection.

History

1901–2000 at Jersey City Public Library
The Jersey City Museum dates back to 1901, when its collection was housed on the fourth floor of the Jersey City Free Public Library on Jersey Avenue, in the Van Vorst Park section of downtown. It closed in 1953 for lack of funding and re-opened in 1975. Jersey City historian J. Owen Grundy served five times as the museum president.

The collection remained under the aegis of the library until 1987, when the museum association initiated efforts for the founding of a separate nonprofit institution. In 1993, the Jersey City Redevelopment Agency (JCRA) donated a building on Montgomery Street for display of the museum collection.

2001–2013 at Montgomery Street
The museum relocated to a new location (also in the Van Vorst Park section) in 2001. The cream-colored brick building at 350 Montgomery Street, a former post office warehouse circa 1929, was renovated at the cost of $6.5 million, to become the museum's next location. Designed by architect Charles Alling Gifford, the interior offered a modern space enhanced by a skylight lobby. The re-fitted building included several galleries, a 152-seat theater, museum offices, a classroom, and a gift shop.

The stated mission of the museum was to serve the community by "maintaining, preserving, and interpreting the region's cultural heritage". In order to stimulate community participation in the visual arts and to reflect the cultural diversity of New Jersey, the museum gave special attention to the exhibition of contemporary art, and it recognized the visual artists residing in New Jersey and its metropolitan area. For example, the museum hosted the debut of a solo exhibition of the works of Priscila De Carvalho.

Due to financial difficulties and in danger of losing the building, the museum closed to the general public in December 2010, amid speculation that it might not reopen. However, the building was purchased by the Jersey City Medical Center in February 2012 for partial use as offices, with the remaining space and theater dedicated to display of the museum collection that reopened in June, but closed permanently soon thereafter. A 2015 court ruling decided that the city government was not obligated to financially support the museum and that the collection belonged to the museum association.

2018 donation to Rutgers
The museum's collection comprises American art and material culture from the colonial period through the present, including painting, sculpture, decorative arts, photography, works on paper, furniture, metals, textiles, maps, industrial objects, and ephemera. It included works by contemporary artists David Wojnarowicz, Chakaia Booker, and Emma Amos, pieces by Colin Campbell Cooper, and a large body of work by nineteenth-century painter August Will.

In 2018, the museum collection (estimated between 5,000 to 10,000 works) was donated to the Zimmerli Art Museum at Rutgers University.

Pathside Building

In April 2016, the city government announced that it was considering purchasing the building at 25 Journal Square. The building had been built in 1912 as part of the Public Service transportation hub for its streetcar lines. That corporation became known as Public Service Electric and Gas Company, whose transportation business became the nucleus of the NJ Transit bus network and the Newark City Subway. The building had been purchased in 1996 by Hudson County Community College, which renamed it to "Pathside". The college used the building until 2017. The city purchased the edifice through its redevelopment agency, JCRA, in 2018 and, after an RFP, awarded Office of Metropolitan Architecture the commission to conceive and design a new space for a new Jersey City Museum.

Centre Pompidou x Jersey City
In June 2021, the city announced that the Pathside building would be renovated for use as a satellite of the Centre Pompidou in Paris. Under a five-year extendable contract, the renovated Pathside would house an exhibition of artworks from Centre Pompidou, following closure of the Paris museum for its three-year renovation, planned to begin in late 2023. The satellite museum will be called Centre Pompidou x Jersey City. An opening in early 2024 is scheduled, with works of the twentieth and twenty-first centuries drawn from Pompidou's 120,000-piece collection.

See also
 Museum of Russian Art
 Mana Contemporary

References

External links
 The New York Times articles on the Jersey City Museum
 Exterior view of the museum
 Interior view of the museum

Culture of Jersey City, New Jersey
Art museums and galleries in New Jersey
Museums in Hudson County, New Jersey
Buildings and structures in Jersey City, New Jersey
Art museums established in 1901
1901 establishments in New Jersey
Tourist attractions in Jersey City, New Jersey